Vengeance is the third studio album by Australian alternative metal band Twelve Foot Ninja. It was released on 15 October 2021 and contains ten tracks. It is part of a multimedia project that includes a 1000-page high fantasy novel titled The Wyvern and the Wolf by Nicholas Snelling and a graphic novel based on the concept of the album. The album entered the ARIA Albums Chart at number 20 during its first week of release.

This is the last Twelve Foot Ninja album before the band went on indefinite hiatus. On 17 December 2021, vocalist Nik Barker announced that he would depart the band in late 2022 after a final planned Australian tour and after a new vocalist is in place. The band have also announced an upcoming European tour for 2023 while in search for a new vocalist. However, on 12 July 2022, the band announced their hiatus and cancelled all their upcoming tours in 2023.

Critical reception

Vengeance received a few positive reviews. Jimmy Glinster of Heavy magazine wrote an unrated track-by-track review for the album.

Track listing

Personnel
Twelve Foot Ninja
 Kin Etik – lead vocals
 Steve "Stevic" MacKay – lead guitar
 Rohan Hayes – rhythm guitar, backing vocals
 David de Vent – bass guitar
 Shane "Russ" Russell – drums

Additional musicians
 Tatiana Shmayluk (Jinjer) – vocals on track 9

Charts

References

2021 albums
Twelve Foot Ninja albums